David Steinberger is an American businessman, publishing executive, current Chairman of the National Book Foundation, and Executive Chairman of Open Road Integrated Media Inc. His career has involved the acquisition, management and sale of a number of publishers and publishing-related companies as well as the application of digital technologies to publishing companies. He previously served as CEO of Arcadia Publishing and CEO of the Perseus Books Group, following leadership roles at HarperCollins. In January 2021 he announced a succession plan at Arcadia, handing over day-to-day management to a successor and moving to Arcadia's board of directors. In December 2021, Steinberger led an investor group in the acquisition of Open Road Integrated Media inc., which utilizes data science technology to market eBooks, with Steinberger being named Executive Chairman, along with the role of CEO to be added in January 2022.

Early life and education 
Steinberger was born in New York, attended High School in Tenafly N.J. He graduated from Columbia University's School of Engineering and earned an MBA from the Wharton School.

Early career 
Steinberger's career began in New York City government where he rose to become Deputy Transportation Commissioner for Bridges.  According to the New York Times, Steinberger's willingness to speak openly about public safety concerns contributed to his departure from the position in 1991.  After City Government, Steinberger joined management consultancy Booz Allen Hamilton.

Publishing career 
In 1996 Steinberger left Booz Allen Hamilton to join the publishing industry as President of the Adult Trade Group at HarperCollins Publishers, a Division of NewsCorp.  Steinberger became CEO of Perseus Books Group in 2004.  After Steinberger completed a series of acquisitions, Perseus Books was named Publisher of the Year in 2007 by Publishers Weekly which described the company as "arguably the most important independent publishing company in the nation." Perseus Books launched digital initiatives which the New York Times described as providing "hundreds of small publishers easier access to digital book technology"  Books published by Perseus included Friday Night Lights by Buzz Bissinger, as well as books by chess champion Garry Kasparov,  Nobel Physics Prize-winner Richard Feynman, and Nobel Peace Prize winner Leymah Gbowee. Steinberger sold Perseus Books in 2016 in 2 simultaneous transactions, to Hachette Books Group and Ingram Content Group,  after an earlier attempt at an exit transaction fell through.

In 2018, Steinberger and lead investor Michael Lynton, chairman of Snap Inc., assembled an investor group to acquire independent publishing businesses, starting with Arcadia Publishing where Steinberger became CEO. The investor group includes Len Blavatnik, Tony Ressler and Walter Isaacson.  Arcadia, noted for its unique approach to publishing hyper-local titles subsequently acquired Pelican Publishing, Wildsam and River Road Press.  In 2021 Steinberger announced a leadership succession plan at Arcadia, turning over day-to-day management to a successor and moving to Arcadia's board of directors.

Steinberger is chairman of the National Book Foundation, presenter of the National Book Awards.  During his tenure, the National Book Foundation in 2016 appointed Lisa Lucas as executive director, the first Black person and the first woman in that role and launched Book Rich Environments, described by the LA Times as turning "book deserts into literary oases."  Steinberger is also a board member of the Fund for the City of New York.

In December 2021, Steinberger led an investor group in the acquisition of Open Road Integrated Media inc., which utilizes data science technology to market eBooks, with Steinberger being named Executive Chairman, along with the role of CEO to be added in January 2022.

Personal life 
Steinberger is married to Dara Caponigro, the creative director at F. Schumacher & Co., and former Editor-in-Chief at Veranda, Decoration Director at House Beautiful and Style Director at Domino.

References 

Year of birth missing (living people)
Living people
American publishing chief executives
Columbia School of Engineering and Applied Science alumni
Wharton School of the University of Pennsylvania alumni